Nicola Zabaglia or Zaballi (Buda di Cascia, 1664 – Rome, 27 January 1750) was an Italian builder known best for his design of scaffolding, often used for decorating ceiling frescoes.

Son of Alessandro, a capomastro (builder) for St Peter's Basilica. In 1686, he began to work with the Fabbrica of St Peter. In 1743, with the help of the publisher Giuseppe Bottari and engraver Niccolò Pagliarini a book titled Castelli e ponti di Nic. Zabaglia, describing his engineering projects. It was republished in 1824 under the editorial supervision of Filippo Maria Renazzi. Zabaglia is buried in Santa Maria in Traspontina.

References

1664 births
1750 deaths
Italian engineers
18th-century Italian architects